Janice Ferri Esser (sometimes credited only as Janice Ferri) is an American writer known for her work on the daytime television serials The Young and the Restless and The Bold and the Beautiful.

Positions held
The Young and the Restless
Script Writer: 1989 - May 4, 2007; August 27, 2008 – present
Script Editor: 2004 - 2007; 2008-2017 (as backup)

The Bold and the Beautiful
Story Consultant: April, 2007 - June, 2008
Script Writer: June 5, 2007 - October 21, 2008

Awards and nominations
Daytime Emmy Awards
Nominations (1991–1995, 1997–2001, 2003–2006, 2009-2022 – Outstanding Drama Series Writing Team, The Young and the Restless; and 2007–2008 – Outstanding Drama Series Writing Team, The Bold & the Beautiful)
Wins (1992, 1997, 2000, 2006, 2011, 2014, 2017, 2019 & 2021 – Outstanding Drama Series Writing Team, The Young and the Restless)

Writers Guild of America Award
Nominations (1999, 2001–2002, 2005–2006, 2008-2009, 2010-2011, 2012-2013, 2013-2014, 2021-2022 seasons; The Young and the Restless)
Wins (2002, 2005, 2008, 2010, 2013, 2020; The Young and the Restless)

References 

American soap opera writers
Daytime Emmy Award winners
Writers Guild of America Award winners
American women television writers
Year of birth missing (living people)
Living people
American women screenwriters
Women soap opera writers
21st-century American women